Persatuan Sepakbola Indonesia Banyumas, commonly known as Persibas Banyumas, or Persibas, is an Indonesian football team based in Banyumas Regency, Central Java. They currently play in Liga 3.

History
 In 1950 ISB or Ikatan Sepakbola Banyumas was Founded.
 In 1986 ISB changed by the Banyumas Government to be Persibas Banyumas
 In 2014 Play in 2014 Liga Nusantara and Promoted to 2015 Liga Indonesia Premier Division
 In 2015-2016 All Indonesian Liga was Canceled due to suspended by Kemenpora RI
 In 2017 Play in 2017 Liga 2 Indonesia
 In 2018 Play in 2018 Liga 3 Indonesia
 In 2019 Play in 2019 Liga 3 Zona Central Java

Players

Current squad

Stadium
Persibas plays their home matches in Satria Stadium in Purwokerto which seats 8,000 spectators.

Supporters
Group supporters who are currently actively supporting Persibas Banyumas including Laskar Bombastik, Laskar Satria, Ultras Knight Rebel, and there are several other groups of supporters.

Rivalries
The main and fierce rival of Persibas is Persibangga Purbalingga. Persibas also built up rivalries with PSCS Cilacap. The derby between the three is called the Derby Ngapak
.

Notable former players
  Zee van Gaps (1980s-1990s)
  McGedy Buton (1980s-1990s)
  Waluyo (2003-2007)
  Ali Barkah (2015)
  Andesi Setyo Prabowo (2017)

References

External links
 

Football clubs in Indonesia
Football clubs in Central Java
1986 establishments in Indonesia
Association football clubs established in 1986
Banyumas Regency